Santa Rosa, officially the City of Santa Rosa, is a 1st class component city in the province of Laguna, Philippines. According to the 2020 census, it has a population of 414,812 people.

It is the second largest local government unit in Laguna after Calamba. On August 28, 2019, President Rodrigo Duterte signed Republic Act No. 11395, which separated the city from the first district, allowing it to elect its separate representative beginning in the 2022 elections. However, for the purposes of electing Sangguniang Panlalawigan members, Santa Rosa remains part of the province's first Sangguniang Panlalawigan District.

Santa Rosa was initially known for the Coca-Cola and Toyota manufacturing plants in its industrial estates. Recently, it has become popular for being the site of Enchanted Kingdom, a local theme park, and several housing developments.

History 

In 1571, Spanish conquistador Juan de Salcedo, the grandson of Miguel López de Legazpi, founded the town of Biñan which was annexed as a barrio to Tabuco (now Cabuyao) while exploring the region of Laguna de Bay.

In 1688, Biñan, together with Barrio Bukol, separated from Cabuyao. After a series of renaming and separating barrios to become independent towns, Barrio Bukol was politically emancipated as the municipality of Santa Rosa, which was named after Saint Rose of Lima. The municipality of Santa Rosa was founded on January 18, 1792.

During the revolutionary period in 1898, the town was instrumental in the proclamation of Philippine independence from Spain when the country signed the Act of Independence on June 12, 1898. Later on, the town's local revolutionaries fought alongside the forces of Pío del Pilar during the Philippine–American War.

On February 5, 1945, the town was abandoned by Japanese soldiers when the local guerrilla resistance movement, with support from the American and Filipino military contingent, entered the town, where skirmishes, torture, and deaths occurred.

During the postwar era up until the 1970s, the townspeople primarily depended on basic agriculture and family-owned enterprises for their livelihood. The influence of industrialization grew in the 1980s with the entry of local and foreign investors who were responsible for the fast-paced economic and social transformation of the town and the province.

Cityhood 

On July 10, 2004, Santa Rosa was converted into a city by Republic Act No. 9264, which was approved by voters in the plebiscite. Leon Arcillas, who was sworn in for his third and final term ten days before, became its first city mayor.

Contemporary
Arcillas was assassinated at the former city hall by three (one being female) gunmen. They were convicted and sentenced to life imprisonment in 2013. Jose Catindig Jr., who served as vice mayor, became mayor to serve out the remainder of his term. On May 14, 2007, Catindig, who ran for his full term as mayor, was defeated by Arcillas' daughter, Arlene B. Arcillas.

Geography

It is located west of Laguna de Bay.

The western half of the city occupies the numerous commercial, industrial, and business establishments, while the other is primarily composed of residential areas and subdivisions, schools, industrial zones, and various business establishments.

Barangays

Santa Rosa is politically subdivided into 18 barangays:

Aplaya
Balibago 
Caingin
Dila
Dita
Don Jose
Ibaba
Kanluran (Barangay Poblacion Uno)
Labas
Macabling
Malitlit
Malusak (Barangay Poblacion Dos)
Market Area (Barangay Poblacion Tres)
Pooc (Pook)
Pulong Santa Cruz
Santo Domingo
Sinalhan
Tagapo

Climate

Demographics
The population of Santa Rosa is fast-growing with an intercensal growth rate of 7% from 1990 to 1995, exponentially increasing in subsequent decades (except between the 2007 and 2010 censuses).

Some inhabitants of Santa Rosa today erroneously refer to themselves as "Rosanians"; since Santa Rosa is a Spanish name, the correct demonym should be "Rosaños".

Ethnic groups
Like other places in Metro Manila, the original settlers in Santa Rosa are Tagalogs. Throughout the centuries, there has been constant migration of Spaniards, Visayans, Bikolanos, Ilokanos, Chinese, and Americans.

Languages
The main language is Filipino, which is based on Tagalog. In addition, due to continuous development of the city, English is used in education, business and information technology.

Religion

Most people are Roman Catholics. Other religious groups represented include the Aglipayans (members of the Iglesia Filipina Independiente – a breakout group from the Catholic Church in 1902 headed by the Union Obrera Democratica), the Church of God International, the United Church of Christ in the Philippines, Jesus Is Lord Church, Baptist, Jehovah's Witness, and Iglesia Evangelica Unida de Cristo (Unida Evangelical Christian Church). In 1994, some migrants and expatriates have formed the Saint Nicholas Orthodox Church (under the canonical jurisdiction of The Orthodox Metropolitanate of Hong Kong/Philippines-Ecumenical Patriarchate) in Golden City Subdivision.

Economy 

Santa Rosa is considered to be the premier city and hub of South Luzon. It is also known as the Lion City of South Luzon. Santa Rosa is now the richest city in Luzon outside of Metro Manila in terms of annual income.

Special economic zones and industrial parks in Santa Rosa include:

Laguna Technopark Inc.
Greenfield Automotive Park
Toyota Special Economic Zone
Lakeside Evozone Nuvali
Daystar Santa Rosa Industrial Park
Santa Rosa Commercial Complex
Meridian Industrial Complex

Banking
Major commercial banks in the Philippines operate in the city. Currently, the city hosts banking institutions that offer banking services to businesses and residents. Most of these are concentrated in barangays Balibago, Don Jose, Macabling, Pulong Santa Cruz, Santo Domingo, and Tagapo.

Car dealerships
A number of car brands have put up dealerships in Santa Rosa. Prominent car dealerships include Toyota, Chevrolet, Ford (Borromeo), Foton, Honda (ANC), Hyundai, Isuzu (Gencars), JMC, Kia, Mazda (Borromeo), MG Motor (Greenfield), Mitsubishi (Amcar), Nissan (Greenfield), Subaru (ANC), and Volkswagen (Greenfield).

Furthermore, the Borromeo's Ford and Mazda have recently set up shops while two of the six ANC Group brands, Honda and Subaru, have branches in Santa Rosa.

Shopping malls

The city host various shopping malls: SM City Santa Rosa, Robinsons Sta. Rosa, Ayala Malls Solenad, Walter Mart Santa Rosa, Walter Mart Santa Rosa Bel-Air, Victory Mall Santa Rosa, Target Mall, Vista Mall Sta. Rosa, Paseo Outlets (formerly and still commonly known as Paseo de Santa Rosa), Laguna Central, Arcadia, and Eton City Square. A new branch of CityMall in the city is currently under construction.

Industries and manufacturing
Dubbed as the "Motor City of the Philippines" or "Detroit City of the Philippines", Santa Rosa is host to multinational automotive giants Nissan Motors Co., Ltd., Toyota Motor Corporation, and Mitsubishi – all contributing 95 percent of the country's automotive production. It is also the location for the headquarters of Santarosa Motor Works, Inc.

Food conglomerate Monde Nissin Corporation, which manufactures Lucky Me! instant noodles and Monde biscuits, has a  manufacturing facility in the city. San Miguel Brewery and Magnolia also have a plant in the city. Santa Rosa is also home to the largest plant of The Coca-Cola Company in the Philippines, situated next to the Santa Rosa Exit of South Luzon Expressway. In 2018, Santa Rosa became the new home of HAMBURG Trading Corporation's  facility that houses the company's warehouse, administration office, and state-of-the-art demo kitchen – all in one roof.

Information technology
Santa Rosa is aiming to be the next hub for the BPO industry. It is currently ranked 82nd in the world for its competitiveness in the Information Technology and Business Process Outsourcing services (IT-BPO) by the leading strategic advisory firm, THOLONS. BPO companies present in Santa Rosa are IQor, KGB, Teletech, IBM, Ubisoft, and Concentrix.

Education

Maranatha Living Hope Academy

Infrastructure

Transportation

Santa Rosa is serviced by South Luzon Expressway (SLEX) and Cavite–Laguna Expressway (CALAX). Two exits of SLEX are located in the city: Santa Rosa Exit and Eton City (Malitlit) Exit. The city is also accessible through Greenfield City (Mamplasan) Exit in Biñan, which provides access to CALAX, SM City Santa Rosa, and the Santa Rosa city proper. Two exits of CALAX directly serve the city, namely: Sta. Rosa City Exit (located in Barangay Carmen, Silang, Cavite) and Laguna Boulevard Exit (located within the city). A four-lane national highway from Alabang, Muntinlupa up to Calamba, Laguna passes through the city. Another road, Santa Rosa-Tagaytay Road, acts as the main route for people going up to Tagaytay from Metro Manila, especially on weekends and vacation periods.

Public transportation within the city, like in most of the urban areas in the Philippines, is facilitated mostly using inexpensive jeepneys. Tricycles are also used for short distances.  The Santa Rosa railway station is located in barangay Labas, near the city center. The city is also the location of the Santa Rosa Commercial Complex, a well-known intermodal transport and commercial hub in barangay Balibago, and the Santa Rosa Integrated Terminal, a provincial bus station serving Metro Manila and eventually other parts south of Metro Manila.

Utilities and communication
Santa Rosa's source of electricity is partly from Meralco. Its water supply is provided by the Laguna Water Inc., except for Vista Land Developments (including Sta. Elena City), which is provided by Primewater Infrastructure Corporation. Santa Rosa's communication system is powered by Philippine Long Distance Telephone (PLDT) and Globe Telecom, and the cellular network in the Philippines, particularly in metropolitan areas, is increasing due to the low cost of calls and text messaging. Globe Telecom, Smart Communications (PLDT), and Dito Telecommunity provide cellular networks in Santa Rosa. Cable and satellite Television access is provided by SkyCable, G Sat, Cignal Digital TV, and Royal Cable. Internet Digital Subscriber Line or DSL coverage is provided by PLDT, cable internet is serviced by SkyCable's ZPDee and Global Destiny. Fiber Internet Wireless broadband is provided by Globelines Broadband and Smart Communications.

Health
The Santa Rosa Community Hospital is the primary public hospital of Santa Rosa. The city also hosts at least seven other private hospitals: New Sinai MDI Hospital and Medical Center, Marian Hospital, Balibago Polyclinic and Hospital, St. James Hospital in Dita, Sta. Rosa Hospital and Medical Center along RSBS Boulevard in Balibago, The Medical City South Luzon in Greenfield City, and QualiMed Hospital – Sta. Rosa in Nuvali.

Government

Santa Rosa City is governed primarily by the city mayor, the vice mayor, and the city councilors. The mayor acts as the chief executive of the city while the city councilors act as its legislative body. The vice mayor, besides taking on mayoral responsibilities in case of a temporary vacancy, acts as the presiding officer of the city legislature. The legislative body is composed of 12 regular members and representatives from the barangay and the youth council.

Elected officials

Former Elected officials

Former mayors
The following is the list of chief executives of Santa Rosa, Laguna.
 Francisco Arambulo (1890–1894)
 Basilio B. Gonzales (1899–1900)
 Pedro Teaño Perlas (1900–1901)
 Pablo Monsod Manguerra, Sr. (1900–1901)
 Celerino Castillo Tiongco (1905–1907)
 Feliciano Arambulo Gomez (1908–1911)
 Honorio Tiongco (1912–1916)
 Lorenzo Cartagena Tatlonghari (1916–1922)
 Jose Vallejo Zavalla (1922–1925)
 Aquilino Carballo (1925–1926)
 Felixberto Castro Tiongco (1926–1928)
 Benito Lijauco delos Reyes (1928–1931)
 Hermenegildo Regalado delos Reyes (1931–1937)
 Celso Gonzaga Carteciano (1938–1940)
 Valentin Regalado delos Reyes (1941–1942)
 Jose Alumno Alinsod (1942 – August 1943)
 Valentin Regalado delos Reyes (August–December 1943)
 Eduardo de Leon Marcelo (1944)
 Angel Z. Tiongco (1944 – March 6, 1945)
 Jose Alumno Alinsod (March 7, 1945)
 Francisco Gomez Arambulo Jr. (1946–1947)
 Felimon delos Trinos de Guzman (1948–1951)
 Gervacio Almira de Guzman (1952–1955)
 Angel Z. Tiongco (1960–1978)
 Cesar E. Nepomuceno (February 3, 1978 – December 3, 1987)
 Zosimo B. Cartaño (February 3 – December 3, 1987)
 Leo T. Bustamante (OIC, December 3, 1987 – February 2, 1988)
 Roberto R. Gonzales (1988 – June 30, 1998)
 Leon C. Arcillas (June 30, 1998 – May 10, 2005)
 Jose B. Catindig, Jr. (May 11, 2005 – June 30, 2007)
 Arlene B. Arcillas (June 30, 2007 – June 30, 2016)
 Danilo Ramon S. Fernandez (June 30, 2016 – June 30, 2019)
 Arlene B. Arcillas (June 30, 2019 – present)

Notable personalities

Arlene B. Arcillas, incumbent mayor

Maria Carpena, stage actress and soprano singer. She was the first recording artist in the Philippine music industry. She was also dubbed as the country's "Nightingale of Zarzuela".
Mark Herras, actor and Starstruck Season 1 Ultimate Survivor
Alden Richards, actor and former Ginoong Santa Rosa
Jason Fernandez, former vocalist of Rivermaya, singer
Koreen Medina, actress, model and StarStruck Avenger
Jef Gaitan, former Rosas ng Santa Rosa and Banana Split mainstay
Nadine Samonte, actress and StarStruck Avenger
Jodi Sta. Maria, actress
Juancho Triviño, actor and host

References

External links

 
 [ Philippine Standard Geographic Code]
Philippine Census Information
Local Governance Performance Management System

 
1792 establishments in the Philippines
Cities in Laguna (province)
Populated places established in 1792
Populated places on Laguna de Bay
Component cities in the Philippines